The gold penny was a medieval English coin with a value of twenty pence (i.e.  pound sterling).

History

Need for higher value coins
Until the reign of King Henry III of England (1216–1272), any need in England for coins worth more than one penny, at the time a silver coin, was met by the use of Byzantine or Arabic gold and silver coins which circulated among merchants and traders. However, as commerce increased, so did the need for higher value coins. In 1257, Henry instructed his goldsmith, William of Gloucester, to produce a coinage of pure gold.

Introduction and use
The gold penny was introduced, with a value of twenty pence. The coin's obverse showed the king enthroned, in his royal attire, with a scepter in his right hand and a globus cruciger in his left, with the legend HENRICUS REX III (King Henry III). The reverse contained a long cross extending to the edge, with a flower in each quarter, and the moneyer's name in the legend, thus WILLEM ON LVND (William of London). Some examples read LVNDEN or LVNDE instead of LVND.

The gold penny was not popular. Thomas Carte, in his A general history of England, says that the citizens of London made a representation against them on 24 November 1257, and that "the King was so willing to oblige them, that he published a proclamation, declaring that nobody was obliged to take it [the gold penny], and whoever did, might bring it to his exchange, and receive there the value at which it had been made current, one halfpenny only being deducted from each, most probably for the expense of coinages".

Valuation and melting
Compared to its bullion weight, the coin was undervalued. By 1265, the gold in the coin was worth twenty-four pence rather than twenty, and it is believed that most of the coins were melted down for profit by individuals. Gold coins would not be minted again in England until the reign of King Edward III about seventy years later.

Disappearance
As all the coins were recalled and melted down, the gold penny completely disappeared from view, and all knowledge of its prior existence was forgotten.  However, in the 1700s, documentation came to light indicating that it had been minted. Inevitably, a few coins escaped the melt—perhaps being lost.  Eight examples are now known to survive.

Surviving examples
In 2022, an example found with a metal detector in Hemyock was sold at auction for £540,000.

References

English gold coins
Coins of medieval England
1257 establishments in England